The Wayne County Courthouse is a historic courthouse located in Richmond, Wayne County, Indiana.  It was built during the period 1890–93, and is in the Richardsonian Romanesque style. The building was designed by Cincinnati, Ohio, architect James W. McLaughlin and the construction was supervised by New Castle, Indiana, architect William S. Kaufman. The "U"-shaped building measures approximately 214 feet by 128 feet, and is constructed of brick faced with Indiana Limestone.  It features a projecting entrance pavilion, high pitched hipped and gable roofs, large semicircular arches, and octagonal corner tower.  Architectural historians Michael Tomlan and Mary Raddant-Tomlan have suggested that the Wayne County Courthouse was influenced both in terms of exterior design and elements of interior layout by Henry Hobson Richardson's Allegheny County Courthouse in Pittsburgh, Pennsylvania.  

It was listed on the National Register of Historic Places in 1978. It borders the northern boundary of the Old Richmond Historic District which includes some of Richmond's earliest extant architecture.

References

External links
 Information and photos from Waynet.org

County courthouses in Indiana
Historic American Buildings Survey in Indiana
Courthouses on the National Register of Historic Places in Indiana
Romanesque Revival architecture in Indiana
Government buildings completed in 1893
Buildings and structures in Richmond, Indiana
National Register of Historic Places in Wayne County, Indiana
1893 establishments in Indiana